The pigeon drop (also known as Spanish Handkerchief) is a confidence trick in which a mark, or "pigeon", is persuaded to give up a sum of money in order to secure the rights to a larger sum of money, or more valuable object.

To perform a pigeon drop, two con artists pose as strangers to each other and manipulate a mark into seemingly finding a large amount of "lost" money.  The two con artists convince the mark that they can all legitimately claim equal shares of the found money if they each put up some amount of their own money to prove good faith; the mark, unaware that the two others are confederates, believes that they have independently judged this to be a wise course of action. The con artists take possession of the mark's money and hand over what the mark believes to be his share of the found money, or even the entirety of the find if he believes he has been made its trustee. In actuality, the con artists use sleight of hand to give the mark a worthless decoy, such as an envelope full of newspaper scraps. The con artists can then easily leave in the guise of fulfilling some part of the agreed-upon process, such as depositing the funds or filling out legal paperwork, and will be long gone by the time the mark detects the deception.

In popular culture

In The Golden Girls, season 5, episode 22 "Cheaters," Blanche and Sophia are victims of a pigeon drop at the local mall. They are unaware of it until Rose points it out.

In The Rockford Files, season 2, episode 2 "The Farnsworth Strategem," Audrey Wyatt (played by Linda Evans) states she had only met Simon Lloyd "last year. He was working a bad variation of the pigeon drop scam and I cleaned it up."

In John D. MacDonald's book Pale Gray for Guilt, Travis McGee, with the help of his sidekick Meyer, takes $60,000 from a mark using the pigeon drop scheme.

In Better Call Saul, season 1, episode 10 "Marco", Jimmy uses a form of the pigeon drop with his friend Marco, using fake Rolexes or "rare" coins as the lure.

In the 2003 film Matchstick Men, Roy Waller (Nicolas Cage), Frank Mercer (Sam Rockwell), and Waller's daughter Angela (Alison Lohman)  attempt to pull a version of the pigeon drop on businessman Chuck Frechette (Bruce McGill).  It does not turn out well.

In the 1987 film House of Games, psychiatrist Margaret Ford (Lindsay Crouse) finds herself joining a group of con artists led by Mike Mancuso (Joe Mantegna) in what she believes to be a pigeon drop targeting someone else, only to find out later she was the true target of the scam.

In the 1967 film The Flim-Flam Man, Mordecai Jones (George C. Scott) and accomplice Curley (Michael Sarrazin) successfully conduct an intricate pigeon drop on Jarvis Bates (Slim Pickens).

In Patrick Rothfuss's book The Wise Man's Fear, Denna describes to Kvothe a 'weeping widow rook', in which a female con artist works with a pawnshop owner to scam young men with money into buying a cheap ring for much greater than its value.

In the Squid Game one character convinces Ali Abdul to take a pouch full of pebbles convincing him it is full of the marbles needed to win.

See also 

 Advance-fee scam

References

External links
 Video of a live pigeon drop

Confidence tricks